The first season of Call Me Mother premiered on October 25, 2021. The cast was announced on October 5 2021

The prize package for the winner includes an all-inclusive seven-night stay for two at the Secrets Vallarta Bay Hotel in Puerto Vallarta, Mexico, courtesy of Air Canada Vacations, a year’s supply of BPerfect Cosmetics, a year’s supply of Wella Professionals hair product and the chance to be the Wella Face of Pride for 2022, a consultation with leading LGBTQ management company Producer Entertainment Group and a single which will be produced and released by their recording label, PEG Records, a meeting with top tv and film agents at Clear Talent Group, the opportunity to be featured in an upcoming Daddy Couture Clothing campaign, and a cash prize of $25,000.

On June 3, 2021, it was announced that Peppermint, Crystal and Barbada de Barbades would be leading the series as the mothers to the competing drag houses. Dallas Dixon was also announced as the host. It was later revealed that Farra N. Hyte and Miss Butterfly would be joining the series as aunties. The series was the highest-rated original production in OutTV's history. On December 15, two days after the first season finale, OutTV announced the renewal of the series for a second season.

The winner of the first season of Call Me Mother was Toddy, with Kiki Coe and Valerie Hunt as runners-up.

Contestants
Names, and cities stated are at time of filming.

Notes:

Contestant progress
Legend:

Special guests 
Guests appearing over the course of the season, giving guidance to the competing artists in video chat sessions or serving as guest judges, included Adam All, Trixie Mattel, Vinegar Strokes and Matthew Camp.

Episodes

References

2021 Canadian television seasons
2021 in LGBT history